Warren Heywood Williams (1844 in New York City – January 1888) was an American architect, who spent most of his career working in the U.S. state of Oregon. Starting in 1860, he apprenticed in San Francisco as a draftsman at the architectural firm of his father, Stephen H. Williams, and Henry W. Cleaveland. Warren Heywood Williams and his wife, Christina (c. 1847–1929), had two sons who became architects, Warren Franklin Williams (died 1917) and David Lochead Williams (born September 2, 1866).

Williams worked as an architect from 1869 to 1887. He worked with his father in the firm then named S.H. Williams & Son, while the elder and younger Williams were both living in San Francisco. In January 1873, Warren Williams moved with his wife and three children to Portland, Oregon. From then until mid-1874, he was partners in an architecture firm with E.M. Burton. Subsequently, Williams partnered with Justus Krumbein from 1875 to 1878. Williams was an architect of cast-iron buildings in the United States and Canada.

Williams died of pneumonia in January 1888.

Works

See also
National Register of Historic Places listings in Southwest Portland, Oregon

References

1844 births
1888 deaths
Architects from Portland, Oregon
Architects from New York City
Architects from San Francisco
19th-century American architects
Deaths from pneumonia in the United States